Events from the year 1993 in Michigan.

Top Michigan news stories

Broadcast and newspaper members of the Associated Press voted on the top news stories in Michigan for 1993 as follows:

 School finance. After the Kalkaska school system was forced to close 40 days early, Governor Engler and the Michigan Legislature put Proposal A (a school finance and property cut proposal) on the June 2 ballot. After Proposal A was defeated, Governor Engler and the Legislature ended the use of property taxes to fund schools.
 Jack Kevorkian. After Kevorkian attended three assisted suicides in one month, the Legislature adopted an immediate ban on assisted suicide. Kevorkian attended five suicides after the ban, was jailed, and staged two hunger strikes, the second one lasting 17 days. Two courts then ruled the suicide ban to be unconstitutional.
 Baby Jessica case. Jan and Roberta DeBoer took their custody fight for their two-and-a-half year old daughter to the U.S. Supreme Court. Jessica was ultimately returned to her biological parents in Iowa.
 Malice Green murder case. Two Detroit police officers were tried and convicted the December 1992 beating death of Malice Green.
 Coleman Young. Young announced his retirement after 20 years as Mayor of Detroit. Dennis Archer was elected to replace him.
 Donald Riegle. Riegle announced that he would retire at the end of his term in the U.S. Senate.
 Base closings. Wurtsmith Air Force Base was decommissioned after 70 years, but several companies announce plans to open operations on the site.  Plans were also finalized to close K. I. Sawyer Air Force Base.
 House Fiscal Agency.  Michigan and federal officials investigated $1.8 million in alleged misspending by the agency, including thousands spent on bonuses from a petty cash account.
 NAFTA. Michigan Congressman and House Majority Whip David Bonior led an effort to defeat NAFTA. Michigan's 10 House Democrats and both U.S. Senators (both Democrats) voted against NAFTA. The state's five House Republicans voted for NAFTA.
 Recovery of U.S. automobile industry.

In separate balloting by Michigan AP newspapers and broadcast stations, the state's top sports stories were selected as follows:

 Fab Five in Final Four. Chris Webber's illegal timeout at the end of the championship game in the 1993 NCAA basketball tournament.
 Dennis Rodman traded by the Pistons.
 Chris Webber turned pro.
 Bill Laimbeer retired.
 Cecil Fielder signed the richest contract in Major League Baseball history: five years for $36 million.
 1993 Rose Bowl. Michigan defeated Washington as Tyrone Wheatley rushed for 235 yards and three touchdowns.
 The Detroit Red Wings hired Scotty Bowman as coach.
 After the 1992-93 Detroit Pistons failed to qualify for the playoffs, head coach Ron Rothstein was fired.
 1993 Detroit Tigers season. The team was in first place in late June, but fell to third place by the end of the season.
 Brothers Luke and Murphy Jensen from Ludington, Michigan, won the doubles championship at the 1993 French Open.

Office holders

State office holders

 Governor of Michigan: John Engler (Republican)
 Lieutenant Governor of Michigan: Connie Binsfeld (Republican)
 Michigan Attorney General: Frank J. Kelley (Democrat)
 Michigan Secretary of State: Richard H. Austin (Democrat)
 Speaker of the Michigan House of Representatives: Paul Hillegonds (Republican)
 Majority Leader of the Michigan Senate: Dick Posthumus (Republican)
 Chief Justice, Michigan Supreme Court: Michael Cavanagh

Mayors of major cities
 Mayor of Detroit: Coleman Young
 Mayor of Grand Rapids: Gerald R. Helmholdt
 Mayor of Flint: Woodrow Stanley
 Mayor of Lansing: Jim Crawford/David Hollister
 Mayor of Ann Arbor: Elizabeth Brater/Ingrid Sheldon

Federal office holders

 U.S. Senator from Michigan: Donald Riegle (Democrat)
 U.S. Senator from Michigan: Carl Levin (Democrat)
 House District 1: Bart Stupak (Democrat)
 House District 2: Pete Hoekstra (Republican)
 House District 3: Paul B. Henry (Republican)/Vern Ehlers (Republican)
 House District 4: Dave Camp (Republican)
 House District 5: James A. Barcia (Democrat)
 House District 6: Fred Upton (Republican)
 House District 7: Nick Smith (Republican)
 House District 8: Milton Robert Carr (Democrat)
 House District 9: Dale Kildee (Democrat)
 House District 10: David Bonior (Democrat)
 House District 11: Joe Knollenberg (Republican)
 House District 12: Sander Levin (Democrat)
 House District 13: William D. Ford (Democrat) 
 House District 14: John Conyers (Democrat)
 House District 15: Barbara-Rose Collins (Democrat)
 House District 16: John Dingell (Democrat)

Population

Sports

Baseball
 1993 Detroit Tigers season – Under manager Sparky Anderson, the Tigers compiled an 85–77 record and tied for third in American League East. The team's statistical leaders included Alan Trammell with a .329 batting average, Mickey Tettleton with 32 home runs, Cecil Fielder with 117 RBIs, John Doherty with 14 wins, and Mike Henneman with a 2.64 earned run average.

American football
 1993 Detroit Lions season – Under head coach Wayne Fontes, the Lions compiled a 10–5 record and finished first in the NFC Central Division. The team's statistical leaders included Rodney Peete with 1,670 passing yards, Barry Sanders with 1,115 rushing yards and 130 points scored, and Herman Moore with 935 receiving yards.
 1993 Michigan Wolverines football team – Under head coach Gary Moeller, the Wolverines compiled an 8–4 record, tied for fourth in the Big Ten Conference, defeated NC State in the 1993 Hall of Fame Bowl, and were ranked No. 21 in the final AP poll. The team's statistical leaders included Todd Collins with 2,509 passing yards, Tyrone Wheatley with 1,129 rushing yards and 84 points scored, Derrick Alexander with 621 receiving yards.
 1993 Michigan State Spartans football team – Under head coach George Perles, the Spartans compiled a 6–6 record and lost to Louisville in the 1993 Liberty Bowl. The team's statistical leaders included Jim Miller with 2,269 passing yards, Duane Goulbourne with 973 rushing yards, Mill Coleman with 671 receiving yards, and Bill Stoyanovich with 65 points scored.

Basketball
 1992–93 Detroit Pistons season – Under head coach Ron Rothstein, the Pistons compiled a 40–42 record and finished sixth in the NBA's Central Division. The team's statistical leaders included Joe Dumars with 1,809 points, Isaiah Thomas with 671 assists and Dennis Rodman with 1,132 rebounds.

Ice hockey
 1992–93 Detroit Red Wings season – Under head coach Bryan Murray, the Red Wings compiled a 47–28–9 record and finished second in the NHL Norris Division. Steve Yzerman led the team with 58 goals, 79 assists, and 137 points. The team's goaltenders included Tim Cheveldae (67 games) and Vincent Riendeau (22 games).

Other

Music and culture

Chronology of events

January

February

March

April

May

June

July

August

September

October

November

December

Births
 August 3 - Thomas Rawls, running back for Michigan, Central Michigan and Seattle Seahawks, in Flint, Michigan

Gallery of 1993 births

Deaths
 January 21 - Charlie Gehringer, Detroit Tigers second baseman  (1924–1942) and Baseball Hall of Fame inductee, at age 89 in Bloomfield Hills
 February 15 - Buzz Fazio, professional bowling star and member of the Stroh's Beer bowling team in the 1950s, at age 85
 February 25 - Eren Ozker, one of the original Muppeteers who grew up in Farmington Hills, at age 44 in New York City
 March 23 - Zolton Ferency, lawyer, political activist, professor, and gubernatorial candidate, at age 70
 May 15 - Marv Johnson, early Motown singer ("You Got What It Takes"), at age 54 in Columbia, South Carolina
 July 4 - Don Dohoney, American football end at Michigan State and consensus All-American in 1953, at age 61 in Meridian, Michigan
 July 31 - Paul B. Henry, U.S. Congressman, at age 51 in Grand Rapids
 October 24 - Cloyce Box, Detroit Lions end/halfback (1949–1954) who broke multiple team receiving records, at age 70 in Frisco, Texas
 November 4 - Doris Satterfield, outfielder for the Grand Rapids Chicks (1947–1954) in the All-American Girls Professional Baseball League, at age 67 in Grand Rapids
 Date unknown - Edie Parker, writer and wife of Jack Kerouac

Gallery of 1993 deaths

See also
 History of Michigan
 History of Detroit

References